KXNW (channel 34) is a television station licensed to Eureka Springs, Arkansas, United States, serving Northwest Arkansas and the Arkansas River Valley as an affiliate of MyNetworkTV. (While Eureka Springs is located in the Springfield, Missouri market, Nielsen considers this station to be part of the Fort Smith–Fayetteville market.) The station is owned by Nexstar Media Group alongside Rogers-licensed NBC affiliate KNWA-TV (channel 51) and Fort Smith–licensed Fox affiliate KFTA-TV (channel 24). The three stations share studios on Dickson Street in downtown Fayetteville, with a satellite studio in Rogers and a news bureau and sales office on Kelley Highway in Fort Smith. KXNW's transmitter is located on Humphrey Mountain near Garfield.

Even though KXNW broadcasts a digital signal of its own, its broadcasting radius does not reach Fort Smith. Therefore, the station is simulcast in high definition on KFTA-TV's fifth digital subchannel from a transmitter in unincorporated northeastern Crawford County (south of Artist Point). Instead of channel 24.5, KFTA-DT5 maps to channel 34.1.

History
Channel 34 began operations on June 19, 2000 as KWBS-TV, which stood for "WB Springfield"; however, original station owner Equity Broadcasting decided to make another new station, KWBM (channel 31), as the WB affiliate for Springfield, and KWBS instead affiliated with Pax (now Ion Television). KWBS dropped the Pax-affiliation in 2003 in favor of the Equity-owned Lick TV, which was a short-lived network that broadcast professional wrestling events. One year later, the station dropped that network and finally affiliated with The WB as its Northwest Arkansas affiliate. This was accompanied by a call-letter change to KWFT.

After it was announced in January 2006 that The WB and UPN would close down to form The CW in September, KWFT changed its call letters to KBBL-TV on July 6, 2006. However, its Fort Smith repeater retained the KWFT-LP call sign, which to this day it still uses. The KBBL-TV call letters were almost certainly not inspired by the KBBL-TV of The Simpsons, even though both stations are located in a DMA with the same name as the Simpsons' fictional hometown. Equity likes to use former radio call letters from its hometown of Little Rock, Arkansas as TV call letters, and the KBBL call sign was once used by a Little Rock radio station.

Around the same time as the call-letters change, KBBL-TV was announced as joining the Retro Television Network (then owned by Equity) after The WB ceased operations, but as a result of KPBI-CA (channel 46) losing its Fox affiliation to then-NBC affiliate KFTA-TV (channel 24) and joining MyNetworkTV, channel 34 changed its call letters to KPBI on September 22, 2006 and began to carry KPBI-CA's programming schedule (KFDF-CA, the station that was originally scheduled to join MNTV, ended up becoming the RTV affiliate).

After failing to find a buyer at a bankruptcy auction, KPBI was sold to Pinnacle Media in August 2009 (after having initially been included in Silver Point Finance's acquisition on June 2 of several Equity stations) with Pinnacle assuming control under a local marketing agreement with soon-to-be-former owner Equity on August 5 that same year. Pinnacle Media officially took ownership on November 3, 2009 and was restructured into Riverside Media in August 2010 with a change in the minority (40%) ownership in the company.

It was announced on August 12, 2009 that KPBI would switch to RTV, which had been dropped from KFDF in January after the network severed its ties with Equity. As of October 30, 2011, KPBI has dropped from RTV in favor of the MeTV programming. In 2010, KFSM-TV launched a second digital subchannel affiliated with MyNetworkTV.

Purchase by Local TV and then by Tribune
On September 1, 2011, Local TV, the owners of the CBS-affiliate KFSM, filed papers with the Federal Communications Commission to purchase KPBI for $784,000 through a "failing station" waiver. This is necessary because the Fort Smith-Fayetteville DMA has only seven "unique" full-power television stations (though the ABC affiliate KHOG-TV is a satellite of Fort Smith-based parent KHBS, the FCC considers the parent and its satellite together as all one unit). That number of unique full-power stations is normally not enough to legally support a duopoly. The sale to Local TV was completed on January 5, 2012; on that day, the station's callsign was changed to KXNW.

Immediately upon consummation, all remaining MeTV and RTV programming was dropped in favor of a simulcast of KFSM digital subchannel 5.2, which carries MyNetworkTV programming (also on KFSM-DT2) during primetime hours on weeknights, syndicated programming during the daytime hours and at select time periods on weekend mornings and afternoons and a part-time affiliation with Antenna TV on weekdays from 1–7 a.m., Saturdays from 1–8 a.m., and 6 p.m.–6 a.m. and Sundays from 6–8 and 9–10 a.m., and 12–6 a.m. In addition, KXNW's digital subchannel 34.2 dropped Univision and began simulcasting KFSM's CBS-affiliated main channel 5.1. As of 2016, KXNW added a simulcast of KFSM-DT3 on 34.2, resulting in the KFSM-DT1 simulcast moving to a new 34.3 subchannel.

On July 1, 2013, Local TV announced that its stations would be acquired by the Tribune Broadcasting. The sale was completed on December 27. With the completion of the deal, KFSM and KXNW became Tribune's smallest stations by market size (previously, the company's New Orleans duopoly of WGNO and WNOL-TV held this distinction).

Aborted sale to Sinclair Broadcast Group
On May 8, 2017, Hunt Valley, Maryland-based Sinclair Broadcast Group announced that it would acquire Tribune Media for $3.9 billion, plus the assumption of $2.7 billion in debt held by Tribune. Had the deal received regulatory approval, the transaction would have given KFSM and KXNW new sister stations in the company's ABC affiliates in bordering markets, KTUL in Tulsa and KATV in Little Rock. Three weeks after the FCC's July 18 vote to have the deal reviewed by an administrative law judge amid "serious concerns" about Sinclair's forthrightness in its applications to sell certain conflict properties, on August 9, 2018, Tribune announced it would terminate the Sinclair deal, intending to seek other M&A opportunities. Tribune also filed a breach of contract lawsuit in the Delaware Chancery Court, alleging that Sinclair engaged in protracted negotiations with the FCC and the U.S. Department of Justice's Antitrust Division over regulatory issues, refused to sell stations in markets where it already had properties, and proposed divestitures to parties with ties to Sinclair executive chair David D. Smith that were rejected or highly subject to rejection to maintain control over stations it was required to sell.

Sale to Nexstar Media Group

On December 3, 2018, Irving, Texas–based Nexstar Media Group—which owns NBC affiliate KNWA-TV (channel 51) and Fox affiliate KFTA-TV—announced it would acquire the assets of Tribune Media for $6.4 billion in cash and debt. Nexstar was precluded from acquiring KFSM and KXNW directly or indirectly, as KFSM and KNWA both fall within FCC criteria prohibiting common ownership of two of the four highest-rated television stations in any market nor does it allow ownership of more than two stations in the same media market. Therefore, Nexstar was required to sell either KNWA/KFTA or KFSM/KXNW to a separate, unrelated company to address the ownership conflict.

On March 20, 2019, McLean, Virginia–based Tegna Inc. announced it would purchase KFSM-TV from Nexstar upon consummation of the merger, as part of the company's sale of nineteen Nexstar- and Tribune-operated stations to Tegna and the E. W. Scripps Company in separate deals worth $1.32 billion. KXNW was not named in the sale, which opens the possibility of either the formation of a de facto triopoly between KFTA and KNWA (which Nexstar retained through an existing satellite station waiver that predated KFTA's conversion into a separately programmed Fox affiliate in 2006) or the retention of its existing duopoly partnership with KFSM, pending disclosures by Nexstar in subsequent paperwork concerning the deal. Ultimately, Nexstar opted to retain KXNW. This was allowed since KXNW's city of license is in the Springfield market, though for all intents and purposes it is a Fort Smith–Fayetteville station.

Newscasts
On March 12, 2012, KXNW began airing a weekday morning newscast at 7 a.m. and a nightly newscast at 9 p.m. that are produced by KFSM. The latter newscast competes with the primetime newscast which airs seven days a week on KFTA-TV (one hour on weekdays, and a half-hour on weekends).

As of September 19, 2019, KXNW no longer broadcasts newscasts from KFSM due to KXNW being bought by Nexstar Media Group and KFSM's acquisition by Tegna.

Technical information

Subchannel

Analog-to-digital conversion
Because it was granted an original construction permit after the FCC finalized the DTV allotment plan on April 21, 1997, the station did not receive a companion channel for a digital television station. Instead, at the end of the digital TV conversion period for full-service stations, KPBI was required to turn off its analog signal and turn on its digital signal (called a "flash cut").

, this station was scheduled to go dark in 2009. According to the station's DTV status report, "On December 8, 2008, the licensee's parent corporation filed a petition for bankruptcy relief under Chapter 11 of the federal bankruptcy code... This station must obtain post-petition financing and court approval before digital facilities may be constructed. The station ceased analogue broadcasting on February 17, 2009, regardless of whether digital facilities are operational by that date. The station filed authority to remain silent if so required by the FCC."

While the DTV Delay Act extended this deadline to June 12, 2009, Equity applied for an extension of the digital construction permit in order to retain the broadcast license after the station goes dark.

References

External links

MyNetworkTV affiliates
Rewind TV affiliates
XNW
Nexstar Media Group
Television channels and stations established in 2000
2000 establishments in Arkansas